Ants Pauls (born 30 March 1940) is an Estonian politician. He was a member of X Riigikogu.

Pauls was born in Kaiu Parish (present-day Rapla Parish). He has been a member of Res Publica Party.

References

Living people
1940 births
Res Publica Party politicians
Members of the Riigikogu, 2003–2007
People from Rapla Parish